Yash Pandit (Yasodhan Pandit) is a Bollywood and television actor.

Career
In his childhood, he also performed in Chetan Anand's Haathon Ki Lakeeren as a child artist.

He has acted as a lead actor in films Rok Sako To Rok Lo, Yeh Kya Ho Raha Hai?, Mr Hot Mr Kool and Faltu, which won the National Award for best Welfare film, and has done a special appearance role in the 2016 film LoveShuda. He also appeared in the TV serials Ghar Ki Lakshmi Betiyann as Siddharth, Kyunki Saas Bhi Kabhi Bahu Thi as Lakshya Virani, Hum Dono Hain Alag Alag as Tappu (Varun), and he did dance performances in a reality dance show Tyohaar Dhamaka on 9X. He has acted in Star Plus's Tere Mere Sapne, recently played the male lead role of Satya in Life OK's Savitri - EK Prem Kahani, opposite Ridhi Dogra. Also did MTV's Splits Villa 8 as a celebrity contestant.

His sisters, Shraddha Pandit and Shweta Pandit, are Bollywood playback singers.

Filmography

Film
 Ram Teri Ganga Maili (1985) as Ganga's Baby (uncredited)
 Haathon Ki Lakeeren (1986) as Child (uncredited)
 Yeh Kya Ho Raha Hai? (2002) as Johnny
 Rok Sako To Rok Lo (2004) as Dev
 Faltu(2005) as Faltu
 Mr Hot Mr Kool (2007) as Prem Amar 'Pat' Tripathi
 Loveshhuda (2016) as Vinayak Sen Gupta
 Nanhi Si Kali: Betiyaan (2018)
 Sweet Lie (2019, Short)

Television
 Kyunki Saas Bhi Kabhi Bahu Thi (2008) as Laksh Virani
 Tyohaar Dhamaaka (2000)
 Ghar Ki Lakshmi Betiyann (2006) as Siddharth
  Ek Din Achanak (2009)
 Hum Dono Hain Alag Alag (2009) as Varun Kothari
 Tere Mere Sapne (2009-2011) as Sarju
 Savitri - EK Prem Kahani (2013) as Satya Choudhary / Senapati Veer
 Savdhaan India as Various 
 Splitsvilla (2012) as himself
 Adaalat (2016) as Aarav Sharma
 C.I.D (2016-2017) as Karan (Behrupiya Biwi) / Aman (Raaz Apaharan Ki Saazish Ka)
 Anniversary Surprise as Raj (2019)
 Daayan (2019 as Dibang
 Mere Dad Ki Dulhan (2019) as KK
 Ghum Hai Kisikey Pyaar Meiin   (2021-present) as Dr. Pulkit Deshpande, Devyani's husband

References

External links
 
 Filmography at Bollywood Hungama

Living people
Year of birth missing (living people)
Indian male television actors
Indian male film actors
Indian male soap opera actors
Male actors in Hindi cinema
Place of birth missing (living people)